Xerosiphon aphyllus is a flowering plant in the amaranth family (Amaranthaceae). It is native to Brazil.

References

Amaranthaceae
Flora of Brazil